Israel Cole (born 28 October 1964) is a Sierra Leonean boxer. He competed in the men's light middleweight event at the 1984 Summer Olympics.

References

External links
 

1964 births
Living people
Sierra Leonean male boxers
Olympic boxers of Sierra Leone
Boxers at the 1984 Summer Olympics
Place of birth missing (living people)
Light-middleweight boxers